Nikos Tzogias (1921 – 1 March 1996) was a Greek film actor. He appeared in 26 films between 1949 and 1987.

Selected filmography
 Anthropos yia oles tis doulies (1966) .... Stefanos
 Phaedra (1962) .... Felere
 Dead City (1951) .... Petros Petrokostas
 The Last Mission (1950) .... Nikos Loranis

External links

1921 births
1996 deaths
Male actors from Athens
20th-century Greek male actors